Setzin is a village and a former municipality  in the Ludwigslust-Parchim district, in Mecklenburg-Vorpommern, Germany. Since May 2019, it is part of the municipality Toddin.

References

Ludwigslust-Parchim
Former municipalities in Mecklenburg-Western Pomerania